Marc Graeme McNulty (born 14 September 1992) is a Scottish professional footballer who plays as a striker for Orange County SC in the USL Championship.

He began his career with Livingston, moving to England aged 21 to play for Sheffield United. Following loan spells at Portsmouth and Bradford City, in 2017 he moved to Coventry City. After a season in which he helped Coventry win promotion via the playoffs, McNulty was sold to Reading.

Reading have since loaned McNulty to Hibernian (twice), Sunderland and Dundee United. During his first loan with Hibernian, McNulty earned selection for the Scotland national team.

Club career

Livingston
McNulty was in the youth team that won the SFL under-19 League and Cup double in 2008–09, and further league titles in 2009–10 and 2010–11.

McNulty attended Portobello High School and played for the youth teams of Hutchison Vale, Celtic and Hibernian. After being released by Hibernian, he felt he "wasn't going to make it in football" and "it was over". He signed for second-tier Livingston aged 16, but the club were immediately demoted to the bottom level of Scottish league football for financial reasons, albeit this drop to a lower level gave him opportunities in senior football earlier than would otherwise have been expected. He made a goalscoring debut at on 31 October 2009 after coming on as a late substitute in a 3–0 away win over Montrose, and made nine appearances in his debut season in the first team (Livingston were promoted as champions), while a prolific goalscoring record at under-19 level earned him a new three-year contract in February 2010. The following season in the Second Division, he made only five league appearances in an campaign interrupted by injury, although the club were promoted again.

2011–12 saw McNulty emerge as Livingston's top goalscorer as they returned to the First Division, netting 16 goals in all competitions. His form saw him attract the attention of clubs south of the border such as Sheffield United and Derby County. He extended his stay with Livingston on 25 July 2013 by signing a new two-year contract. His final campaign with the Lions was his most productive, with 17 league goals from 35 appearances.

Sheffield United
On 19 May 2014, McNulty joined Sheffield United on a three-year deal for an undisclosed fee which would become effective on 1 July 2014. The transfer fee was believed to be between £95,000 and £125,000. McNulty scored his first competitive goal for the Blades in a 2–1 League Cup first round win over Mansfield Town on 13 August 2014. In November 2014, he was ruled out after sustaining a facial injury after an altercation in a night club in Edinburgh, with United manager Nigel Clough claiming that McNulty was the "innocent party". On 16 December 2014, McNulty scored the only goal in a 1–0 home victory over Southampton to send United to the semi-finals of the League Cup.

On 6 November 2015, McNulty joined Portsmouth on a short-term loan deal. On 7 November he made his debut in the first round FA Cup game against Macclesfield Town, with Portsmouth winning 2–1. On 24 November 2015, he scored a hat-trick in a 6–0 win against York City. On 4 January 2016, his loan at Portsmouth was extended until the end of the season after scoring six  goals in 11 appearances.

On 31 August 2016, McNulty joined Bradford City on a season-long loan deal. He was recalled by Sheffield United on 2 January 2017.

Coventry City
On 18 May 2017, McNulty agreed to join League Two side Coventry City on a two-year deal. He scored his first goal for the club in his second appearance in a 2–0 win against Grimsby Town. On 12 May 2018, in the home leg of the promotion play-off semi-finals against Notts County, McNulty scored his 100th career goal – a controversial penalty – to make the scoreline 1–1 going into the away leg at Meadow Lane, where he scored again in Coventry's 4–1 win, sending them to the final on 28 May. McNulty was named man-of-the-match in the final, a 3–1 win over Exeter City which saw the Sky Blues promoted to back to League One.

Reading
On 6 July 2018, Reading announced the signing of McNulty to a four-year contract for an undisclosed fee. He made only six starts for the Royals during the first half of the 2018–19 season, and was loaned to Hibernian on 31 January 2019, returning to the club a decade after being released by them as a teenager. He scored his first goal for Hibs on 9 February, in a 3–1 win against Raith Rovers.

McNulty moved on loan to Sunderland for the 2019–20 season. He scored his first goal for Sunderland in an EFL Cup tie against Accrington Stanley on 13 August 2019. His loan with Sunderland was cut short on 31 January 2020, and McNulty was then sent on loan to Hibernian for a second time. Following the formal conclusion of the truncated 2019–20 season, McNulty returned to his parent club in May 2020.

On 5 October 2020, McNulty joined Dundee United on a season-long loan deal.
McNulty scored five goals in thirty games for Dundee United in the 2020–21 season.

On 13 August 2021, McNulty re-signed for Dundee United on a season-long loan.

Orange County SC
On 19 January 2023, McNulty signed with Orange County SC in the American second division, the USL Championship.

International career
McNulty received his first call-up to the Scotland squad in March 2019. He made his debut for Scotland coming on as a substitute for James Forrest in a 3–0 defeat to Kazakhstan in a Euro 2020 qualifier.

Career statistics

Club

International

Honours
Livingston Youth
SFL U-19 League: 2008–09, 2009–10 2010–11
SFL U-19 League Cup: 2008–09

Coventry City
EFL League Two play-offs: 2018
Individual
EFL League Two Player of the Month: January 2018

References

External links

1992 births
Living people
Footballers from Edinburgh
Sportspeople from Livingston, West Lothian
Footballers from West Lothian
People educated at Portobello High School
Association football forwards
Scottish footballers
Celtic F.C. players
Hibernian F.C. players
Livingston F.C. players
Sheffield United F.C. players
Bradford City A.F.C. players
Coventry City F.C. players
Reading F.C. players
Sunderland A.F.C. players
Dundee United F.C. players
Orange County SC players
Scottish Football League players
Scottish Professional Football League players
English Football League players
Lothian Thistle Hutchison Vale F.C. players
Scotland international footballers
Scottish expatriate footballers
Expatriate soccer players in the United States
Scottish expatriate sportspeople in the United States